Ministry of Economy of the Republic of Poland was a ministry dealing with economy of Republic of Poland.

Created in 1997 from reforms and mergers of other ministries, it has gone through several name changes and has recently been downsized, with issues related to work being split to Ministry of Labour and Social Policy and regional issues split to Ministry of Regional Development. In 2007 the bureau of tourism was moved to Ministry of Sport.

The last minister was Janusz Piechociński. In late 2015 it was merged into the new Ministry of Development.

List of ministers

Ministers for Economy (1997–2003)

External links 

1997 establishments in Poland
Poland, Economy
Economy Ministers
Poland
Economy
Poland, Economy
Former ministries
2015 disestablishments in Poland
Defunct organisations based in Poland
Economy of Poland-related lists